7 Tauri is a multiple star in the northern constellation of Taurus. It has a combined apparent visual magnitude of 5.95, so, according to the Bortle scale, it is faintly visible from suburban skies at night.

In the past, these stars had been treated as a single system, but they are now known to have different proper motions and somewhat different distances.

References

Taurus (constellation)
Tauri, 007
1086
Durchmusterung objects
022091
016664
A-type main-sequence stars